Juchipila (Nahuatl: Xochipillan, "place of noble or beautiful flowers") is a municipality in the Mexican state of Zacatecas, located approximately  southwest of the state capital Zacatecas City.

Geography
The municipality spans the canyon of the Juchipila River, a tributary of the Río Grande de Santiago, which is flanked by the Sierra de Morones to the west and the Sierra de Nochistlán to the east. The municipality borders the municipalities of Apozol to the north, Nochistlán de Mejía to the east, Moyahua de Estrada to the south, Mezquital del Oro to the southwest, Teúl de González Ortega to the west, and Santa María de la Paz to the northwest.

As of 2009, 15.8% of the land in Juchipila is used for agriculture. The remainder of the land cover consists of tropical dry forest (47.4%), temperate forest (28.9%), grassland (7.1%), and urban areas (0.7%).

Juchipila's climate ranges from semiarid in the Juchipila River canyon to temperate in the mountains surrounding it.

History

The Caxcanes had invaded the area in the 13th century from Tuitlán, now known as La Quemada.

Structures at the site date from the late Classic and Postclassic periods, and other structural and archaeological remains indicate inhabitation as early as the first centuries AD. Las Ventanas was one of the most heavily fortified of ancient Mesoamerican sites. Its upper citadel, set above sheer cliffs and accessible only by a steep and narrow stairway with switchbacks, features some of the finest stonework of its kind in all of Mesoamerica.

Xiuhtecuhtli, the leader of Juchipila, was based at Las Ventanas (then known as Tlatlan or Tlaltan) when the Spanish first arrived in the area around 1530–1531. He and other Caxcan leaders led a vigorous resistance to Spanish colonization attempts throughout the 1830s, until the Spanish finally prevailed in the Mixtón War of 1540–1542.

Franciscan friars founded the first monastery in what is now the town of Juchipila around 1532. The church of St. Francis of Assisi, the first built in the region and one of the first in Nueva Galicia, dates to 1627.

From 1548 to 1786, Juchipila was designated an alcaldía mayor of Nueva Galicia, its territory extending from Villaneuva in the north to Moyahua in the south. It then became a subdelegacíon under the Intendancy of Guadalajara until 1804, when it was transferred along with Aguascalientes to the Intendancy of Zacatecas.

After Mexican independence, Juchipila became of the original eleven partidos in the 1825 Constitution of Zacatecas, losing its eastern territories to Aguascalientes and its northern territories to the new partido of Villanueva. The partido of Nochistlán was separated from Juchipila in 1852. When partidos were abolished in 1916, Juchipila was divided into the municipalities of Apozol, Juchipila proper, Moyahua, and Mezquital del Oro.

Administration
The municipal government of Juchipila comprises a president, a councillor (Spanish: síndico), and ten trustees (regidores), six elected by relative majority and four by proportional representation. The current president of the municipality is Maria del Rocio Moreno Sánchez.

Demographics
In the 2020 Mexican Census, Juchipila recorded a population of 12,251 inhabitants living in 3888 households. The 2010 Census recorded a population of 12,284 inhabitants in Juchipila.

There are 30 inhabited localities in the municipality, of which only the municipal seat, also called Juchipila, is classified as urban. It recorded a population of 5836 inhabitants in the 2020 Census.

Juchipila and its neighbouring municipalities have experienced high rates of emigration to the United States since the second half of the 20th century.

Culture and education

The oldest festival in Juchipila is the Fiesta de Xúchitl, celebrated in June on the eve of the octave of Corpus Christi. The tradition has pre-Hispanic roots and was originally dedicated to Xōchipilli, the god of flowers, music, song and dance, being celebrated near the summer solstice and at the onset of the wet season. It was declared intangible cultural heritage of the state of Zacatecas in 2015.

The first investigations of the archaeological site of Cerro de Las Ventanas were made by Aleš Hrdlička, who visited the site in 1898 and 1902. The site was opened to the public in August 2019, although it was closed during the COVID-19 pandemic.

The Polytechnic University of Southern Zacatecas (Universidad Politécnica del Sur de Zacatecas, UPSZ) is located in the village of El Remolino just south of the municipal seat of Juchipila.

Economy and infrastructure
The main economic activities in Juchipila include commerce, services, agriculture and cattle farming. Important crops grown include corn, ornamental plants, and agave. Remittances from the United States also form a large part of the municipality's income.

Federal Highway 23 runs north–south through the municipality, connecting it to Jerez and Fresnillo in the north, and to Zapopan and Guadalajara in the south.

References

Municipalities of Zacatecas
1825 establishments in Mexico
States and territories established in 1825